The 1989 Trans-Am Series was the 24th running of the Sports Car Club of America's premier series. The year marked a new era in Trans Am, with American branded automobiles with American V8 engines, regardless of what vehicle was being used. For example, the Buick Somerset came with a three-liter V6 at best, but was entered with a V8 in the series. This new "American muscle revival" era would last for eleven seasons, after which the Italian manufacturer Qvale would win the championship.

Results

References

Trans-Am Series
1989 in American motorsport